Melançon Arena was an indoor arena located in Saint-Jérôme, Quebec. It was once home to the Saint-Jérôme Alouettes of the Quebec Junior Hockey League mid 1950s to 1969 and Quebec Major Junior Hockey League 1969 to 1972. It was also home to the Saint-Jérôme Panthers of the Quebec Junior AAA Hockey League from 1988 to 2017.

References

External links
 

Indoor ice hockey venues in Canada
Quebec Major Junior Hockey League arenas
Buildings and structures in Saint-Jérôme
Sports venues in Quebec
1954 establishments in Quebec
Sports venues completed in 1954